Caroline was launched in 1799, or 1800, at Ipswich. She had an unusually long service life of almost 60 years. She spent the first 40 years or so as a West Indiaman. She then spent the remainder of her career trading more widely, particularly with Quebec. She was last listed in 1864 with minimal data unchanged since 1859.

Career
Caroline first appeared in Lloyd's Register (LR) in 1800.

Citations

1800 ships
Ships built in England
Age of Sail merchant ships of England